Ombú (Phytolacca dioica) is a massive evergreen tree native to the Pampa of South America, belonging to the order Caryophyllales 

Ombú may also refer to:

El Ombú, a Mennonite settlement in Río Negro Department, Uruguay
El Ombú, a poem by Argentine politician Luis Lorenzo Domínguez 
El Ombú, stories by Anglo-Argentine naturalist William Henry Hudson
Cañada Ombú, a populated place in Vera Department, province of Santa Fe, Argentina
Cuchilla del Ombú, a village in Tacuarembó Department, Uruguay
Battle of Ombú, a military conflict in South America in 1827
Ombu, a village in Tibet